is a Japanese ice hockey player and member of the Japanese national team, currently playing with the Seibu Princess Rabbits in the Women's Japan Ice Hockey League (WJIHL) and the All-Japan Women's Ice Hockey Championship.

Playing career 
As a junior player with the Japanese national under-18 team, she participated in the Top Division tournaments of the IIHF U18 Women's World Championship in 2014 and 2015, and in the Division I tournament in 2016.

Enomoto debuted with the senior national team during the 2016–17 season, participating in the 2017 IIHF Women's World Championship Division I Group A and in the qualification tournament for the 2018 Winter Olympics. She won a gold medal in the women's ice hockey tournament at the 2017 Asian Winter Games in Sapporo.

A two-time FISU World University Games medalist, she won a bronze medal in the women's ice hockey tournament at the 2019 Winter Universiade in Krasnoyarsk and a silver medal in the women's ice hockey tournament at the 2023 Winter World University Games in Lake Placid, New York, during which she served as Japan's captain.

She represented Japan at the IIHF Women's World Championship in 2019 and 2022.

References

External links
 
 ENOMOTO Yoshino at Japan Ice Hockey Federation 

1998 births
Living people
Asian Games gold medalists for Japan
Asian Games medalists in ice hockey
Competitors at the 2019 Winter Universiade
Competitors at the 2023 Winter World University Games
Ice hockey players at the 2017 Asian Winter Games
Japanese women's ice hockey forwards
Medalists at the 2017 Asian Winter Games
Medalists at the 2023 Winter World University Games
Sportspeople from Osaka
Universiade medalists in ice hockey
Universiade bronze medalists for Japan
Universiade silver medalists for Japan
21st-century Japanese women